Jeff Valdez (born January 31, 1956) is an American producer, writer, and studio executive who created the category of Latino Programming in English. The films and TV shows written and produced by Valdez have been syndicated in more than 40 countries.

Valdez is credited as a writer, director, and creator of the family comedy The Brothers Garcia (2000-2003), as well as the creator of the Latino Laugh Festival in 1997. In 2003, Valdez founded a new nationwide English language cable channel targeting Latinos called Sí TV.

In 2007 Valdez joined the board of directors of Maya Entertainment whose focus was on Latino-themed films mostly in English. Valdez founded his production company, New Cadence Productions in 2018 which has produced the HA Comedy Festival (2020) and The Brothers Garcia reboot, The Garcias (2022).

Career
In 1993, Valdez moved to Los Angeles, and created the show "Comedy Compadres", for KTLA, channel 5. He then wrote scripts, produced and directed pilots for Disney (Play Ball), Showtime (Latino Laugh Festival), NBC (Valdez and Hacienda Heights), Galavisión (Cafe Ole, Funny is Funny), and Nickelodeon (The Brothers Garcia).

In 2003, and based on the potential of this English-speaking market of the Latino population, Valdez paired with Bruce Barshop, a venture capitalist and founded Sí TV, the first Latino national channel for English-speaking Latinos in the United States. Sí TV became the leading producer of Latino themed English-language cable programming network, reaching 22 million homes in the first 3 years. Valdez became the CEO of the channel for the first 2 years, and produced the original programming of Sí TV.

In 2007 Valdez was named Chairman of Quepasa Corp./Quepasa.com (NASDAQ-QPSA) a bi-lingual social network aimed at US and Latin American markets.  Valdez contributed to QuePasa's recovery in that period with an overall re-branding and creative vision.  He also helped with a digital product called "Papacito", which increased the reach of the social network.

Valdez joined Maya Entertainment as a co-chairman at the invite of producer, Moctezumq Esparza. From 2007 to 2011 Maya was the only Latino Global Film Distribution Company. The company produced, owned and distributed films and content, primarily in English for theatrical release, as well as syndication.

From 2011 to 2014, Valdez headed up Max 360 Entertainment, which was a group of investors pursuing a variety of Television projects. In 2015 Valdez teamed up with financier Jeffrey Soros to develop a slate of Latino comedy films aimed at the New Mainstream Latino audience.

Early in 2018, Valdez and Sol Trujillo co-founded New Cadence Productions, a U.S. television and film content creation studio, with the intention of continuing to promote Latinos and their role in the media. New Cadence Productions has since partnered with Warner Media.  The studio's first project was the 2020 HA Comedy Festival, which resulted in a 1-hour comedy special streaming on HBO Max. The festival was green lit for a second year in 2021 and the 2021 HA Comedy Special will be released on HBO Max in December 2021, along with the all female comedy special “Comedy Chingonas,” which airs November 18, 2021. The 10 episode reboot of The Brothers Garcia called The Garcias was shot in the Riviera Maya, Mexico, in summer 2021 and is scheduled to release on HBO Max in early 2022.

Valdez created the HA Comedy Festival in 2020, an annual weekend long festival which features Latino comedian performances and ends with a live comedy special that airs on HBO Max. Jeff is credited with writing and producing the HA 2020 festival, and writing, producing and directing the HA 2021 festival.

Awards and recognitions

   "Top 50 People Who Matter" by CNN
   "Top 50 Minorities in Cable" by Multichannel News 
   "50 People to Watch" by Los Angeles Times
   "Top 10 Players in the U.S. Hispanic Media Market" by Ad Age
   "Top 50 Marketers in America" by Advertising Age
    Quasar Award, for his groundbreaking Sí TV 
    Racial Harmony Award, from the Center for Ethnic Understanding
    NHMC Impact Award (2001)
    ALMA Award, from National Council of La Raza

Valdez was appointed by US President Bill Clinton to the Advisory Committee on the Arts of the Kennedy Center (Washington DC, 1996–2000.) He has been a member of the Museum of the Moving Image Board of Directors (New York, 2000–2006), and of The Los Angeles School For The Performing Arts Board of Advisers (2006-2008.)

Filmography
 HA Comedy Festival: The Art of Comedy 2020 and 2021 
 Without Men || Feature Film || Executive producer || 2010
 Unacceptable Behavior || TV Series || Executive producer || 2006
 Urban Jungle 2 || TV Series || Executive producer, Writer || 2005
 Breakfast, Lunch, and Dinner || TV Series || Executive producer || 2004
 Across the Hall || TV Series || Executive producer || 2004
 The Drop || TV Series || Executive producer || 2004
 The Rub || TV Series || Executive producer || 2004
 Latino Laugh Festival: The Show || TV Series || Executive producer || 2004
 Urban Jungle || TV Series || Writer, Executive Producer || 2004
 The Brothers García: Mysteries of the Maya || TV Movie || Writer, Director || 2003
 The Brothers García || TV Series || Co-Creator, Executive Producer, Writer, Director || 2000-2004
 Café Ole' with Giselle Fernandez || TV Series || Writer, Producer || 1997
 Latino Laugh Festival || TV Special || Producer || 1997, 1998, 1999
 Funny is Funny || TV Series || Writer, Executive producer || 1997
 Comedy Compadres || TV Series  || Writer, Executive Producer  ||  1994
 Almost Live From The Comedy Corner || TV Comedy Show  || Writer, Producer, Director  ||  1992
 Perry Mason: The Case of the Ruthless Reporter || TV Movie || Actor || 1991

References

External links 
 

American television producers
Living people
1956 births